The 2008 European Cadet Judo Championships is an edition of the European Cadet Judo Championships, organised by the International Judo Federation. It was held in Sarajevo, Bosnia and Herzegovina from 4 to 6 July 2008.

Medal summary

Medal table

Men's events

Women's events

Source Results

References

External links
 

 U18
European Cadet Judo Championships
European Championships, U18
Judo
Judo
Judo, European Championships U18